Bridgend railway station is a main line station serving the town of Bridgend, south Wales. It is  measured from London Paddington.

It is the fifth-busiest station in Wales, after Cardiff Central, Newport and Swansea.

History

The station was opened on 18 June 1850, and both the main platform building and the 1877 pedestrian bridge are Grade II listed. The station was designed by Isambard Kingdom Brunel.

In 1945, German Field Marshal Gerd von Rundstedt arrived at the station when he was transferred to the Island Farm prisoner of war camp. 

Services on both branch lines from the station were withdrawn for a time in the 1960s & early 1970s (trains on the Vale of Glamorgan line fell victim to the Beeching cuts in June 1964, whilst Maesteg trains were withdrawn in July 1970), but because the lines remained in-situ due to coal traffic for the Aberthaw Power Station, each one has since been reopened to passenger services.

Platform 3 was a full length platform running east-to-west until the 1970s when it was removed following the closure of the Maesteg line to passenger traffic. The cafe/waiting area of platform 2 now occupies land where the track used to sit.

Platform 1A was opened in June 2005 by Andrew Davies to act as the terminus for the newly re-opened Vale of Glamorgan Line, with trains now running through to and from Aberdare.

A second, and fully accessible footbridge, was built in 2012 at a cost of £2.4m and the main station ticket hall and entrance was refurbished in 2018 at a cost of £1.5million.

Facilities

The station is fully staffed throughout the week, with the ticket office on platform 1 open from early morning until mid-evening. A self-service ticket machine is also provided for use and for the collection of pre-paid tickets. There is a waiting room and photo booth in the main building on platform 1, whist the amenities on platform 2 include toilets and a coffee shop. Train running details are offered via CIS displays, automatic announcements and timetable posters. Step-free access is available to all platforms via lifts in the accessible footbridge at the northern end.

Services

Passenger services are operated by Great Western Railway to and from London Paddington and Swansea, with some services extended to Carmarthen; and by Transport for Wales to destinations across Wales.

To the west, Transport for Wales trains run along the South Wales Main Line and West Wales Line to Swansea and then to Carmarthen, Pembroke Dock, Milford Haven or Fishguard Harbour.

Platforms

Platform 1A
 Transport for Wales:
One morning service terminates here from 
Platform 1
 Great Western Railway:
  via .
 Transport for Wales & Swanline:
  via .
  via  from either  or 
  via  from either  or 
  via  from either  or 
  via  on the Heart of Wales Line (limited service).

Platform 2
 Great Western Railway:
 Transport for Wales & Swanline:
  via .

Platform 3
 Transport for Wales:
  via .

Platforms 1 and 2 are full length platforms used for all long distance services on the South Wales Main Line.

Platform 1A was opened in 2005 and is a bay platform which acts as the terminus for the Vale of Glamorgan Line.

Accidents and incidents 
In December 1965 a fatal collision occurred with a derailed Class 47, D1671, and D6983 travelling to Swansea, as the result of a landslip. The damage was so severe, D6983 was the first EE Type 3 to be withdrawn and as a result, the only locomotive in the entire class not to receive a TOPS number. The wreckage blocked the South Wales mainline and the Vale of Glamorgan line. Trains had to be diverted via the Vale of Neath line until unluckily a landslip blocked that route also. After the lines reopened, the remains of both locomotives were sold to local scrap merchants R.S. Hayes and cut up the following year.
On 5 May 2012, a dead body was found on the railway, near the station. The death was treated as unexplained.

References

External links

"Pembroke Coast Express - photos of the station in 1973, 1981 and 2015"

Bridgend
Railway stations in Bridgend County Borough
DfT Category C2 stations
Former Great Western Railway stations
South Wales Main Line
Railway stations served by Transport for Wales Rail
Railway stations served by Great Western Railway
Railway stations in Great Britain opened in 1850
Grade II listed railway stations in Wales
Grade II listed buildings in Bridgend County Borough